This is a list of the former local government districts in Northern Ireland showing statistics for population, population density and area. The figures are from the 2011 Census.

These districts officially dissolved on 1 April 2015 when they were merged into eleven larger districts, statistics for which are listed at Local government in Northern Ireland.

See also
Local government in Northern Ireland
Local Councils in Northern Ireland by area
Local Councils in Northern Ireland by population density
List of districts in Northern Ireland by religion or religion brought up in
List of districts in Northern Ireland by national identity

Notes

Government of Northern Ireland
Districts of Northern Ireland, 1972–2015
Demographics of Northern Ireland
Lists of places in Northern Ireland
Northern Ireland